Danilo Cataldi (born 6 August 1994) is an Italian professional footballer who plays as a midfielder for Serie A club Lazio.

Club career
Cataldi was born in Rome to parents from Missanello, Southern Italy. A product of Lazio's youth system, he was sent on loan to Serie B club Crotone in the 2013–2014 season, where he played as a starter, obtaining 35 appearances and scoring 4 goals.

He made his return in Lazio's first team for the 2014–15 season, making his Serie A debut on 18 January 2015, in the match lost 1–0 against Napoli at Stadio Olimpico. He scored his first goal for the club on 21 August 2016 in a 4–3 away win over Atalanta.

Cataldi was loaned out to Genoa on 13 January 2017 until 30 June 2017.

On 19 July 2017, Cataldi was loaned out to newly promoted Serie A club Benevento.

International career
On 5 March 2014, Cataldi made his debut with the Italy U-21 side in a qualification match against Northern Ireland.

With the Italy U-21 he took part at the 2015 UEFA European Under-21 Championship.

On 5 November 2016, Cataldi was called up to the senior Italian international squad for the first time for 2018 FIFA World Cup Qualification match against Liechtenstein and friendly against Germany.

In June 2017, he was included in the Italy under-21 squad for the 2017 UEFA European Under-21 Championship by manager Luigi Di Biagio. He made his only appearance of the tournament In Italy's second group match on 21 June, a 3–1 defeat to Czech Republic. Italy were eliminated in the semi-finals following a 3–1 defeat to Spain on 27 June.

Career statistics

Club

Honours
Lazio

Coppa Italia: 2018–19
Supercoppa Italiana: 2019

References

External links

1994 births
Footballers from Rome
Living people
Italian footballers
Italy youth international footballers
Italy under-21 international footballers
Association football midfielders
S.S. Lazio players
F.C. Crotone players
Genoa C.F.C. players
Benevento Calcio players
Serie A players
Serie B players